Dampremy is a Charleroi Metro station, located in Dampremy (part of the Charleroi municipality), in fare zone 1. The station is built as a semi-underground station, with underground tracks toward Piges and semi-underground tracks (leading to a viaduct) toward Providence.

Nearby points of interest 
The station is located in a residential area, close to the Dampremy cemetery and the Charleroi end of the Brussels–Charleroi Canal.

Transfers  
TEC Charleroi bus lines 41, 42, Midi-Docherie.

Charleroi Metro stations
Railway stations opened in 1983